Onoskelis (English translation: "she with the ass' legs") was a female demon with a beautiful form mentioned in the Testament of Solomon. The name is usually associated with the hobgoblin, Empusa, who was able to assume various shapes, however in this case, she is a satyra (female satyr).

Origins
"Her body was that of a woman with a fair complexion, but her legs were those of a mule" - TSol 4:2

When Solomon asked her what her purpose was, she stated:
"I am a spirit which has been made into a body. I recline in a den on the earth. I make my home in caves. However, I have a many-sided character. Sometimes I strangle men; sometimes I pervert them from their true natures. Most of the time, my habitats are cliffs, caves, and ravines. Frequently, I also associate with men who think of me as a woman, especially with whose skin is honey-colored, for we are of the same constellation. It is also true that they worship my star secretly and openly. They do not know that they deceive themselves and excite me to be an evil doer all the more. For they want to obtain gold by remembering (me), but I grant little to those who seriously worship me." - TSol 4:4-7

She describes her creation as, 
"from an unexpected voice which is called a voice of the echo of a black heaven, emitted in matter." - TSol 4:8

She travels by the full moon and Solomon commanded her to spin hemp to construct the ropes used for the Temple.
She travels stealthily and kills indiscriminately. She is a half hermit, barely daring to protrude her head out of her caves.

Demons
Demons in Judaism
Testament of Solomon